Charles James Barclay (1841–1904) was an Australian banker.  He was also a member of the Royal Society of Tasmania.

Barclay was born in Tasmania.  He helped found the Hobart Saving Bank.

Barclay also served as a justice of the peace.

Sources
Australian Dictionary of Biography

1841 births
1904 deaths
Australian bankers
19th-century Australian businesspeople